The Two Rivers Correctional Institution is a state prison for men located in Umatilla, Umatilla County, Oregon on the Columbia River, owned and operated by the Oregon Department of Corrections.

The facility opened in 1999, was completed in 2000, and holds a maximum of 1632 inmates at a mix of medium and minimum security levels.

Notable inmates

Living inmates 

 Jeremy Joseph Christian (born 1982) was the perpetrator of the 2017 Portland train attack. Sentenced to two consecutive life sentences without parole.
 Josue Perez-Patricio (born 1999) was convicted of sexual abuse and unlawful sexual penetration of an 8 year old child, while he was still a teenager of in Tigard Oregon. He abused his own 8 year old  niece, 6 year old nephew and another child; age unknown. Sentenced in 2018, to be released in 2029.
 Ward Francis Weaver III (born 1963) was the convicted killer of two teenage girls, Ashley Pond and Miranda Gaddis, in Oregon City, OR, in 2002. Weaver is currently serving 2 Life Sentences for the murders.
 Jeffrey Paul Cutlip (born 1949) was convicted of murdering two women and a teenage girl in the Portland metropolitan area between 1975 and 1993. He is currently serving a life sentence without parole.
 Darren Dee Oneall convicted rapist and murderer serving consecutive life sentences.

References

External links 

 local press description

Prisons in Oregon
Buildings and structures in Umatilla County, Oregon
1999 establishments in Oregon